Arsenie Boca (29 September 1910 – 28 November 1989) was a Romanian priest, theologian, mystic, and artist. He was persecuted by the Communists.

In a poll of the Romanian public conducted by Romanian Television in 2006, Boca was voted 79th among 100 Greatest Romanians.

Studies and formation
Boca was born in 1910, in Vața de Sus; his parents, Iosif and Cristina, gave him the first name Zian. He studied at the Avram Iancu High School in Brad, Hunedoara County, graduating in 1929. The same year he embarked upon study at the Theological Academy in Sibiu, from which he graduated in 1933. He received a scholarship from the Archbishop of Transylvania to study at the Fine Arts Academy in Bucharest. Meanwhile, he attended the medical classes of Professor Francisc Rainer and the Christian Mysticism class of ultra-right ideologist, Professor Nichifor Crainic.

Recognising his artistic talent, Professor Costin Petrescu entrusted him with the painting of a depiction of Mihai Viteazul for the Romanian Athenaeum. Sent by his bishop, he travelled to Mount Athos for documentation and spiritual experience.

Serving the Church
Boca was made a deacon on 29 September 1935 by Metropolitan Nicolae Bălan of Transylvania. In 1939 he spent three months in the Romanian Skete of Prodromos on Mount Athos. On his return, he joined the Brâncoveanu Monastery at Sâmbăta de Sus, Brașov County, where he took his vows and was tonsured into monasticism in 1940. He was ordained priest and became the abbot of the Brâncoveanu Monastery in 1942. As abbot he embellished and renovated the buildings of the monastery, while also enriching its spiritual and cultural life. He helped theologian Dumitru Stăniloae from Sibiu with the translation into Romanian of the first volumes of the Philokalia, a collection of early Church Fathers and monastics in the hesychast tradition. 

In the year 2018, Tatiana Niculescu claimed that he was an adept of Anthroposophy, a spiritual movement initiated by the Austrian occultist Rudolf Steiner, which, allegedly, influenced Boca's paintings from the church at Drăgănescu, wherein the spectre of Jesus Christ rises from the rock covering the grave. She also associated his mind reading powers to the practice of mentalism. Niculescu's accusations were fervently denied by the Arsenie Boca Foundation, in an article by Dutu Florin. The article accuses the novelist of intentionally "falsifying Fr. Boca's biography" by using second-rate accounts from a Securitate file, embellished by her own imagination.

Under Communism
 
After World War II, he was arrested in July 1945 in Râmnicu Vâlcea by the Siguranța secret police and detained for several days. Once the communist regime was installed in Romania, Boca was persecuted by the authorities and the regime's secret police, the Securitate. He was arrested and imprisoned several times for allegedly helping the Romanian anti-communist resistance movement. As reported by Ion Gavrilă Ogoranu in a 1999 interview, General Dumitru Coroamă, a resistance leader who was based in Sibiu, travelled in the fall of 1947 to Sâmbăta de Sus Monastery and met Boca, with whom he planned various anti-communist activities. In June 1948 Boca was arrested and detained at the Securitate facility in Făgăraș. After being released in November, Boca was removed from Brâncoveanu Monastery to Prislop Monastery and thence to Sinaia Monastery. 

Arrested again in January 1951, he was interned by administrative order at the Danube–Black Sea Canal, being released in March 1952. Kept under surveillance, he was re-arrested in November 1955 and sentenced by the Military Tribunal in Timișoara to 6 months imprisonment. Transferred from the Timișoara penitentiary to the Jilava Prison near Bucharest, he arrived at the Oradea penitentiary in December, and was detained there until April 1956. Boca was banned from monasticism and Church activities and was constantly under the surveillance and harassment of the Securitate.

Works of art
Arsenie Boca had his own vision upon creating religious paintings which raised controversy among his sanctification. The paintings that are not according to the Orthodox iconography are the representation of St. Peter's Basilica, or Francis of Assisi and Ulfilas the Arian among Orthodox Saints.

Sanctification

Father Arsenie has not yet been canonized as a saint. Because of this, the monastery is now known as the "Pearl of Țara Hațegului". 

In October 2015 the Romanian Orthodox Church announced that it was considering the cause of his recognition and proclamation as a saint.

 stated that Boca is "neither a saint, nor a heretic", therefore should not be sanctified. He also states that Boca was lightly punished by the Communist regime with "just a few months of prison".

References

External links
 Facebook Page
 Christian Orthodox Association Hieromonk Arsenie Boca Association
 Official Page of Brancoveanu Monastery in Sambata de Sus
 Biography and photos of Arsenie Boca, in Romanian
 Web-page dedicated to Arsenie Boca, in Romanian 
 Explanations why Arsenie Boca was not anymore an orthodox

1910 births
1989 deaths
People from Hunedoara County
Romanian theologians
Folk saints
Romanian prisoners and detainees
Inmates of the Danube–Black Sea Canal
Romanian Orthodox monks
Romanian occultists
Romanian muralists
People associated with Mount Athos
People associated with Great Lavra